Rachel Barlow (born 31 March 1982) is a South African fencer. She competed in the women's individual and team épée events at the 2004 Summer Olympics.

References

External links
 

1982 births
Living people
South African female épée fencers
Olympic fencers of South Africa
Fencers at the 2004 Summer Olympics
21st-century South African women